Yelovka is a rural locality (a settlement) in Pribaykalsky District, Republic of Buryatia, Russia. The population was 320 as of 2010. There are 16 streets.

Geography 
Yelovka is located 34 km southwest of Turuntayevo (the district's administrative centre) by road. Staroye Tataurovo is the nearest rural locality.

References 

Rural localities in Okinsky District